The 2022 Parliament of the Republic of North Ossetia–Alania election took place on 10–11 September 2022, on common election day. All 70 seats in the Parliament were up for reelection.

Electoral system
Under current election laws, the Parliament is elected for a term of five years by party-list proportional representation with a 5% electoral threshold. Seats are allocated using the Imperiali quota, modified to ensure that every party list, which passes the threshold, receives at least 1 mandate ("Tyumen method"). Unlike most regional elections in Russia, party lists in North Ossetia are not divided between territorial groups.

Candidates
To register regional lists of candidates, parties need to collect 0.5% of signatures of all registered voters in North Ossetia.

The following parties were relieved from the necessity to collect signatures:
United Russia
Communist Party of the Russian Federation
A Just Russia — Patriots — For Truth
Liberal Democratic Party of Russia
New People
Rodina
Communists of Russia

Several parties, who participated in the 2017 election, are absent from the ballot: Party of Growth did not file, while Patriots of Russia and Green Alliance had ben dissolved prior.

Results

|- style="background-color:#E9E9E9;text-align:center;"
! colspan=2| Party
! width="75"| Votes
! %
! ±pp
! Seats
! +/–
|-
| style="background-color:;"|
| style="text-align:left;"| United Russia
| 242,091
| 67.88
|  8.69%
| 51
|  5
|-
| style="background-color:;"|
| style="text-align:left;"| A Just Russia — For Truth
| 50,878
| 14.27
|  4.05%
| 10
|  5
|-
| style="background-color:;"|
| style="text-align:left;"| Communist Party
| 44,055
| 12.35
|  5.76%
| 9
|  4
|-
| colspan="7" style="background-color:#E9E9E9;"|
|-
| style="background-color:;"|
| style="text-align:left;"| Rodina
| 8,064
| 2.26
|  1.05%
| 0
| 
|-
| style="background-color:;"|
| style="text-align:left;"| Liberal Democratic Party
| 5,597
| 1.57
|  0.56%
| 0
| 
|-
| style="text-align:left;" colspan="2"| Invalid ballots
| 5,953
| 1.67
|  0.16%
| —
| —
|-
|- style="font-weight:bold"
| style="text-align:left;" colspan="2"| Total
| 356,643
| 100.00
| —
| 70
| 
|-
| colspan="7" style="background-color:#E9E9E9;"|
|-
| style="text-align:left;" colspan="2"| Turnout
| 356,643
| 68.97
|  10.00%
| —
| —
|-
| style="text-align:left;" colspan="2"| Registered voters
| 517,087
| 100.00
| —
| —
| —
|-
| colspan="7" style="background-color:#E9E9E9;"|
|- style="font-weight:bold"
| colspan="6" |Source:
|
|}

United Russia faction head Vitaly Nazarenko was appointed to the Federation Council, replacing incumbent Arsen Fadzaev (A Just Russia).

See also
2022 Russian regional elections

References

North Ossetia
Politics of North Ossetia–Alania
Regional legislative elections in Russia